Comfort and Joy is a 1984 Scottish comedy film written and directed by Bill Forsyth and starring Bill Paterson as a radio disc jockey whose life undergoes a bizarre upheaval after his girlfriend leaves him. After he witnesses an attack on an ice cream van by angry competitors, he is led into the struggle between two Italian families over the ice cream market of Glasgow. The film received a BAFTA Award Nomination for Best Original Screenplay in 1985.

Plot
A few days before Christmas, Glasgow radio disc jockey Allan "Dicky" Bird is stunned when Maddy (Eleanor David), his kleptomaniac girlfriend of four years, suddenly announces that she is moving out. His doctor friend Colin (Patrick Malahide) tries to console him, but Bird is heartbroken.

One day, he goes for a drive to take his mind off his troubles. Noticing an attractive girl, Charlotte (Clare Grogan), in the back of a "Mr. Bunny" ice cream van, he follows it under a railway bridge on a whim and when the van stops, purchases an ice cream cone. (As in Alice in Wonderland, the protagonist has followed a rabbit through a tunnel, with sometimes bizarre consequences.) To his amazement, three men drive up and proceed to smash up the van with baseball bats. The occupants retaliate with squirts of raspberry sauce. By sheer chance, Bird finds himself involved in a turf war between rival Italian ice cream vendors: the young interloper Trevor (Alex Norton) and the older, more established "Mr. McCool" (Roberto Bernardi).

As an admired local celebrity, Bird meets with McCool and his sons Bruno, Paolo, and Renato. He then goes back and forth between them and Trevor and Charlotte (later revealed to be McCool's rebellious daughter), trying to negotiate a peaceful settlement. Various misadventures follow, with his red BMW 323i Baur convertible suffering more and more damage each time. Bird becomes obsessed with resolving the war. To contact the combatants, he starts broadcasting coded messages on his early morning show, causing Hilary (Rikki Fulton), his boss, to ask his secretary if Mr. Bird's contract includes a "sanity clause". Hilary then orders Bird to see a psychiatrist about the Mr. Bunny he keeps trying to reach.

In the end, Bird proposes that the rival entrepreneurs, who turn out to be uncle and nephew, join forces to market a new treat: ice cream fritters. Both sides are impressed by the product's potential. It appeals both to Trevor's fish and chips frying background as well as Mr. McCool's ice cream expertise. Since Bird alone knows the secret ingredient of the ancient Chinese recipe, he cuts himself in for 30% of the gross as well as repairs to his abused car.

During the credits, he is heard trying to record a commercial for the new product: "Frosty Hots".

Cast

 Bill Paterson as Alan Bird
 Eleanor David as Maddy
 Clare Grogan as Charlotte
 Alex Norton as Trevor
 Patrick Malahide as Colin
 Rikki Fulton as Hilary
 Roberto Bernardi as "Mr. McCool"
 George Rossi as Bruno
 Peter Rossi as Paolo
 Billy McElhaney as Renato
 Gilly Gilchrist as Rufus
 Caroline Guthrie as Gloria
 Ona McCracken as Nancy
 Elizabeth Sinclair as Fiona
 Katy Black as Sarah
 Robin Black as Lily
 Ron Donachie as George
 Arnold Brown as Psychiatrist
 Iain McColl as Archie
 Billy Johnstone as Amos

Production
Forsyth originally had an idea for a film about a local DJ. He said "When local stations like Radio Clyde started, it was the first time we had the phenomenon of the local celebrity, famous in a radius of 10 miles, who would open supermarkets in Drumchapel. It was new to Scotland and it was soulful, a guy in his little pod broadcasting to a city in the middle of the night. It gave people a sense of local identity when they heard people on the radio who talked like them."

Forsyth felt he did not have enough for a film, so he added a love story. He needed more, when Peter Capaldi, who came from an ice cream family, told him stories of the ice cream war. "But the way he was telling it, the rivalry was simply over who had the best ice cream," said Forsyth.

“The whole tenor of the film was fluffiness and silliness because that’s what local radio was," said Forsyth. "While the real ice-cream wars in Glasgow were about territories for offloading drugs – they weren’t getting antsy about someone else’s ice cream tasting better – the film was a metaphor for the empty-headed niceness of local radio.”

Forsyth was able to raise money to make the film on the basis of his success with Local Hero. "Local Hero created the impression that my films make money, because it got a lot of coverage and a fair amount of people went to see it. So, in that sense, it made it a bit easier for me to raise money for the next film."

The film was announced in 1983 by Verity Lambert as part of a slate of movies by EMI, the others including Dreamchild, Morons from Outer Space and Slayground. Forsyth said the film was about a man getting a "second adolescence".

Paterson said he had "not a moment of bad memories... the only other difficulty we had were the weather conditions. We tried to shoot Comfort and Joy in November/December in Glasgow: even when the weather’s good the light is gone by 5 o’clock. If you have a day time story you don’t have many hours to shoot it in. We always seemed to be chasing the light on the exteriors. That’s an abiding memory but everything else was a pleasure. I loved it."

Forsyth said about the film "Everyone handling my film was happy about the way things were going, except me," "Universal never expected to make much money on it, so they thankfully didn't exert much pressure on the making of the film. But they didn't invest much in its promotion, either."

Paterson later said "the ending was never quite right. We’d shot another ending and I don’t know why it wasn’t used. There was a tie up between Dickie and Clare Grogan’s character, but it wasn’t properly resolved so we shot another one. Any film that has an unsatisfactory ending isn’t the perfect film because that’s what people leave the cinema remembering."

Reception
The film was screened in Cannes in May 1984. It had its UK premiere as the opening film at the 1984 Edinburgh Film Festival on 14 August 1984. It opened in London on 31 August 1984.

The film was number one at the UK box office for two weeks.

Critical response
In his review in The New York Times, Vincent Canby wrote, "Comfort and Joy is a charming film on its own, but something of a disappointment when compared to Gregory's Girl and Local Hero, in which the inventions were more consistently comic and crazy." The staff at Film4 agreed, calling it "... somehow not as satisfying as his [Forsyth's] early films." The reviewer went on to observe that, "Paterson is always worth seeing, while Grogan and David are equally watchable, but there aren't the belly laughs That Sinking Feeling provides so readily, or the casual charm of Gregory's Girl." Adil. at Variety was also lukewarm, concluding that after "... evincing much laughter over an unexpectedly funny couple living together, Forsyth abruptly switches into a more conventional plot" and that "David and Paterson are terrific together and almost every line between them is a joy. From the point she departs with no explanation the pic flashes a sparky moment or two, but it doesn't reach the high spots again."

On the other hand, Roger Ebert called Comfort and Joy "... one of the happiest and most engaging movies you are likely to see this year, and it comes from a Glasgow director who has made a specialty out of characters who are as real as you and me, and nicer than me."

Rotten Tomatoes gives the film a rating of 100% based on ten reviews.

Awards and nominations

Soundtrack

As with Forsyth's previous film Local Hero, Mark Knopfler provided the film's score. Some musical passages were taken from the 1982 Dire Straits album Love Over Gold.

See also
 Glasgow Ice Cream Wars, similar real-life events

References

External links

 Comfort and Joy at the British Film Institute Film Forever
 Comfort and Joy Screen-on-Line (BFI)
 
 
 
 Comfort and Joy film scene at YouTube
 

1980s British films
1980s Christmas comedy films
1980s English-language films
1984 comedy films
1984 films
EMI Films films
English-language Scottish films
Films directed by Bill Forsyth
Films set in Glasgow
Scottish comedy films
Scottish films
Television series by STV Studios